Diego Epifanio Cabornero (born May 25, 1978), also known as "Epi", is a Spanish basketball coach.

Coaching career
After spending more than 15 seasons in the local youth basketball, Epifanio made his debut in the professional basketball in 2004, as assistant coach. When Andreu Casadevall, head coach, left the club for signing with top tier club CAI Zaragoza in 2015, he took the helm of San Pablo Burgos, finally promoting to Liga ACB in 2017.

In his debut season at the Spanish top league, he managed the team to finish in the 14th position, finally avoiding the relegation.

References

External links
ACB profile 

Living people
CB Miraflores coaches
Spanish basketball coaches
1978 births
Sportspeople from Burgos
Liga ACB head coaches